Luke Bailey (born 17 September 1997) is an Australian wheelchair racer. He represented Australia at the 2020 Summer Paralympics.

Early life
Luke Bailey was born on 17 September 1997 in Wingham, New South Wales. He has caudal regression syndrome and spina bifida. In 2019, he moved to Newcastle, New South Wales to train.

Athletics career
Bailey is classified as T54. After an introduction to Kurt Fearnley, he took up Para-athletics in 2011.

An elbow injury prevented him from competing at the national trials for the 2018 Commonwealth Games, Gold Coast, Queensland.

At the 2019 World Para Athletics Championships, he finished seventh in the Men's 100 m T54 and eighth in the Mixed  relay.

At the 2020 Tokyo Paralympics Bailey finished 14th in his Men's 100m T54 heat and did not advance to the final.

In 2021, he is coached by Andrew Dawes.

References

External links 
 
 International Paralympic Committee
 Athletics Australia Historical Results

1997 births
Living people
Australian male wheelchair racers
Paralympic wheelchair racers
Paralympic athletes of Australia
Wheelchair category Paralympic competitors
Athletes (track and field) at the 2020 Summer Paralympics
People with caudal regression syndrome